Ferdinand "Ferry" van der Vinne (19 July 1886 – 15 November 1947) was a Dutch international footballer who earned three caps for the national side between 1906 and 1907, scoring one goal. Van der Vinne played club football for Haarlemsche FC.

External links
 KNVB profile
 Profile at VoetbalStats.nl

1886 births
1947 deaths
Dutch footballers
Netherlands international footballers
Footballers from Haarlem
Association footballers not categorized by position